Velika Plaža (lit. "Big Beach") is a beach in Ulcinj Municipality, Montenegro. It stretches from Port Milena in Ulcinj to the Bojana River, which separates it from Ada Bojana.

Overview
The sand beach's length is 12,000 meters (8 miles), one of the longest in Europe and the longest beach in Montenegro.

The New York Times included Velika Plaža and Montenegro's South Coast (including Ada Bojana and Hotel Mediteran in a ranking of top travel destinations for 2010 - "Top Places to Go in 2010".

Future development
Velika Plaža is natural asset of Montenegro that the government hopes to see developed as part of the country's tourism development strategy, albeit in an environmentally friendly manner.  The vast hinterland of the beach is mostly undeveloped, so it is potentially the site of the biggest greenfield investment on Montenegrin coast.

So far, a public competition has been announced on creating a masterplan of developing a sustainable waterfront community, through means of public private partnership.

Kitesurfing spot
Velika Plaža beach, near Ulcinj in Montenegro is the premier kiteboarding location on the Adriatic Coast. Fourteen kilometres strip of petty sand beach with strong cross onshore winds almost every day during summer afternoons makes it ideal for safe learning. 
Set in a protected natural area, surrounded by dunes and hidden by alluvial forests you will find the perfect spot to spend summer holidays on your own, with friends or your family. 

It is hard to find better and safer surrounding to learn kiteboarding than here. Shallow, warm water and constant thermal wind make learning here a pure joy. No obstacles in or out of the water. Tides don't affect riding or safety. Current is not that strong to present any significant danger. During the summer average temperature is 34°C, water temperature average is 23°C. Along the beach you can ride superb chop and wave conditions most of the time. Flat water spot is located at the southeast end of the beach, inside the river mouth.

There are a number of kitesurfing schools along the beach.

See also
 Buljarica
 Ladies Beach 
 Valdanos Inlet Beach
 Ada Bojana beach

References

Kite Surfing Paradise Velika Plaža 
Velika Plaža - Ulcinj's Great Beach 
http://www.velikaplaza.info
Ladies's beach at Ulcinj
The 31 Places to Go in 2010, New York Times

Beaches of Montenegro